Bobby Gene Rainey, Jr. (born October 16, 1987) is a former American football running back and return specialist. He signed with the Baltimore Ravens as an undrafted free agent in 2012. He has also played for the Cleveland Browns, Tampa Bay Buccaneers and New York Giants. He played college football at Western Kentucky.

College career
In 2011, Rainey had 1,695 rushing yards and 17 total touchdowns while playing running back at Western Kentucky University. In 2010, Rainey was one of the top rushers in College Football. He led the nation in rushing attempts (340) and was third in the nation in rushing yards (1649). He was named the Sun Belt Conference Offensive Player of the Year in 2010 as well as earning All-American honors from SI.com. In July 2011, he was named to the Maxwell Award Watch List. In August, he was named to the Doak Walker Award Watch list. In 2009, he totaled over 2,100 yards and gained notoriety as one of the premier Kick Returners in College Football. His two official forty yard dash times were 4.42 and 4.45 respectively. He was also a member of the Western Kentucky Track & Field team.

Stats

School records
Rainey holds school records for WKU in rushing yards in a season (1,695) and rushing yards in a career (4,523). He is just the eighth FBS player since 2000 to rack up back-to-back 1,500-yard seasons. That list includes LaDainian Tomlinson (TCU), Ray Rice (Rutgers), Steven Jackson (Oregon State), DeAngelo Williams (Memphis), and Darren McFadden (Arkansas).

Professional career

Baltimore Ravens
Rainey signed with the Baltimore Ravens as an undrafted free agent. On September 10, 2012, he was released. On September 12, 2012, he was re-signed to the practice squad and became practice squad captain. On October 16, 2012, he was promoted to the active roster after the team placed Lardarius Webb on injured reserve. Rainey never made it on the active gameday roster during the 2012 season. On November 13, 2012, he was placed on injured reserve due to a knee injury. Rainey earned a Super Bowl ring when the Ravens defeated the San Francisco 49ers in Super Bowl XLVII.

On August 31, 2013, he was released by the Ravens.

Cleveland Browns
On September 1, 2013, he was picked up by the Cleveland Browns after clearing waivers. He was released after week 7 of the 2013 season.

Tampa Bay Buccaneers

2013 season
In October 2013, he was acquired off waivers by the Tampa Bay Buccaneers. He scored his first career regular season touchdown on November 11, 2013. It was the eventual game-winning TD in the Buccaneers 22-19 win over the Miami Dolphins, serving as Tampa Bay's first win of the 2013 season.

On November 17, 2013, Rainey had 3 touchdowns (2 rushing and 1 receiving) and 163 rushing yards in the Buccaneers' win over the Atlanta Falcons. Due to injuries to Doug Martin and Mike James he would finish his debut Buccaneer season as the team's leading rusher with 137 attempts for 523 yards and 5 touchdowns. He also had 11 catches for 27 yards and 1 receiving touchdown.

2014 season
On March 5, 2014, Rainey signed a one-year deal to stay with the Buccaneers. Rainey compiled 94 attempts for 406 yards and one touchdown only second to Doug Martin. He also had 33 catches for 315 yards and one receiving touchdown.

2015 season
On March 10, 2015, the Buccaneers extended a restricted free agent tender offer of $1.542 million for one year to Rainey restricting him from free negotiating with any other and granting Tampa the right to match any offer he receives from other teams. He signed his one-year tender on April 24.

New York Giants
Rainey signed with the New York Giants on April 11, 2016.

Baltimore Ravens (second stint)
On July 26, 2017, Rainey signed with the Ravens. On September 1, 2017, he was released by the Ravens during final roster cuts. He was re-signed on October 10, 2017 after an injury to Terrance West. In Week 6, against the Chicago Bears, he recorded a 96-yard kickoff return touchdown in the third quarter. On November 13, 2017, Rainey was released by the Ravens.

References

External links
Tampa Bay Buccaneers bio

1987 births
Living people
Players of American football from Georgia (U.S. state)
People from Griffin, Georgia
American football running backs
Western Kentucky Hilltoppers football players
Baltimore Ravens players
Cleveland Browns players
Tampa Bay Buccaneers players
New York Giants players